Paraspheniscoides is a genus of tephritid  or fruit flies in the family Tephritidae.

Species
Paraspheniscoides binarius (Loew, 1861)
Paraspheniscoides senarius (Bezzi, 1924)

References

Tephritinae
Tephritidae genera
Diptera of Africa